The Secretary of State for Justice (SEJUS) is the second-in-command to the Spanish Minister of Justice. The Secretary of State is appointed by the Monarch at the request of the Justice Minister and after hearing from the Council of Ministers.

The SEJUS is responsible for coordinating and collaborating with the justice administration of the Autonomous Communities; organizing, planning, supporting and cooperating with the Administration of Justice and with the Prosecution Ministry; establishing international legal cooperation and relations with international organizations and the European Union; promoting human rights; directing and managing those responsibilities regarding marital status and nationality, notaries, public faith, and civil register; as well as those related to the location, recovery, management and sale of objects, goods, instruments and profits from criminal activities.

Likewise, it is the responsibility of the Secretary of State to promote and elaborate the regulatory projects on matters within its competence and those entrusted by the head of the department, without prejudice to the attributions corresponding to the Ministry's Under-Secretary and the Technical Secretary-General.

History
The Office of Secretary of State for Justice was created on 13 May 1994, when the ministries of Justice and the Interior were merged. From the Secretary of State depended as its highest department the General Secretariat for Justice and this, in turn, had as its superior body a Directorate-General for the judicial infrastructure. Apart from the General Secretariat, it had other departments as the Directorate-General for Registries and Notaries, the Directorate-General of the State Legal Service (current Solicitor General), the Directorate-General for Conscientious Objection and the Directorate-General for Codification and International Legal Cooperation, as well as a cabinet for religious affairs.

As of 1996, the restored Directorate-General for Relations with the Administration of Justice was integrated into it and the cabinet of religious affairs was elevated to the rank of directorate-general. Likewise, the General Secretariat of Justice was abolished and the Judicial Studies Center and the Judicial General Mutuality were assigned to the Secretariat of State for Justice. The structure of the department was not touched again until 2001 when the Directorate-General for the Modernization of the Administration of Justice was created in its midst.

Except for certain changes between its directorates-general, its structure was not modified until 2008, in which the General Secretariat for Modernization and Relations with the Administration of Justice (current SGAJ) was created as an intermediate body between the Secretary of State and some of its addresses general.

In 2010, it underwent its most relevant modification and is still preserved today. The Solicitor General and the Directorate General of Registries and Notaries were directly attached to the Minister and the Secretary of State assumed the competences over international legal cooperation. In 2015, the Office of Asset Recovery and Management (ORGA) was created and assigned to the Secretary of State. As of 2018, the powers of the ORGA are assumed by the Secretary-General for the Administration of Justice (SGAJ).

In 2020, the new justice minister, Juan Carlos Campo, renamed all the Ministry's departments. Despite the name change of the Secretariat of State's bodies, the responsibilities were the same, with the exception of those relating to religious freedom, which were transferred from the Directorate-General for International Legal Cooperation, Relations with Religions, and Human Rights to the Undersecretariat of the Presidency, and the legal security and notaries responsibilities, which were transferred from the Undersecretariat of Justice to the Secretariat of State.

Structure
The Secretariat of State is composed of two departments:
 The General Secretariat for Innovation and Quality of the Public Justice Service.
The General Secretariat is the department responsible for modernizing the Judiciary and the Prosecution Ministry; maintain relationships with the General Council of the Judiciary, the Prosecution Ministry and other bodies and associations of law experts, managing the goods from criminal activities, and exercising the government responsibilities on public registries and marital status and nationality.
These functions are exercised through three departments: the Directorate-General for the Public Justice Service, the Directorate-General for Digital Transformation of the Administration of Justice, and the Directorate-General for Legal Security and Public Faith.
 The Directorate-General for International Legal Cooperation and Human Rights
It is responsible for the international legal cooperation, the relations with the European Union and other organizations in legal matters and the promotion in the international sphere of human rights.
For the exercise of this duties it has two departments: the Deputy Directorate-General for International Legal Cooperation and the Deputy Directorate-General for Justice Affairs in the European Union and International Organizations and Human Rights.

Secretaries of State

References

Secretaries of State of Spain